Togo is a small Sub-Saharan state, comprising a long strip of land in West Africa. Togo's geographic coordinates are a latitude of 8° north and a longitude of  1°10′ east. To the south Togo has  of coastline along the Bight of Benin of the Gulf of Guinea in the North Atlantic Ocean.

Togo is commonly divided into six geographic regions. In the south are low-lying sandy beaches. The coastal region is narrow and followed by tidal flats and shallow lagoons. There are also a number of lakes, the largest of which is Lake Togo.

Land use 
 Natural resources: phosphates, limestone, marble, arable land
 Land use:
 arable land: 44.2%
 permanent crops: 3.7%
 other: 52.1% (2011)
 Irrigated land: 73 km2 (2003)
 Total renewable water resources: 14.7 km2
 Natural hazards: hot, dry Harmattan wind can reduce visibility in north during winter; periodic droughts.

Physical geography 
The country consists primarily of two savanna plains regions separated by a southwest–northeast range of hills (the Chaîne du Togo). In the north lies the Ouatchi Plateau. Terre de Barre is another name for this region, in use because of the reddish leached soil which is rich in iron. This southern area of Togo has been categorised by the World Wildlife Fund as part of the Guinean forest-savanna mosaic ecoregion.

Northeast of the Ouatchi Plateau lies a tableland. The area is drained by the Mono River and its tributaries, including the Ogou River.

To the west and the southwest of the tableland lie the Togo Mountains. These mountains run across the central region of Togo, ranging from the southwest to the northeast. The mountain range reaches into Benin where it is known as the Atakora Mountains and Ghana where it is known as the Akwapim Hills.

North of the Togo Mountains lies a sandstone plateau through which the Oti River flows. The vegetation is characterized by savanna. The River Oti which drains the plateau is one of the main tributaries of the River Volta.

In the far northwest of Togo lies a higher region which is characterized by its rocks: granite and gneiss. The cliffs of Dapaong (Dapango) are located in this part of Togo.

Climate 

To the south there are two seasons of rain (the first between April and July and the second between September and November), even though the average rainfall is very high.
The climate is tropical and humid for seven months while the dry desert winds of the Harmattan blow south from November to March, bringing cooler weather.

Environment 
Current issues:
 deforestation attributable to slash-and-burn agriculture and the use of wood for fuel
 health hazards and impact on the fishing industry from water pollution
 air pollution increasing in urban areas

Togo is party to: Biodiversity, Climate Change, Climate Change-Kyoto Protocol, Desertification, Endangered Species, Law of the Sea, Ozone Layer Protection, Ship Pollution (MARPOL 73/78), Tropical Timber 83, Tropical Timber 94, Wetlands, Whaling

Extreme points 

This is a list of the extreme points of Togo, the points that are farther north, south, east or west than any other location.
 Northernmost point – the tripoint with Ghana and Burkina Faso, Savanes Region
 Easternmost point – unnamed location on the border with Benin in the Mono River immediately west of the Beninese town of Grand-Popo, Maritime Region
 Southernmost point – the point at which the border with Ghana enters the Atlantic Ocean, Maritime Region
 Westernmost point - a point about 2.5 km southsouthwest of the tripoint with Ghana and Burkina Faso, Savanes Region

References